Perella Weinberg Partners L.P. is an American global financial services firm focused on investment banking advisory services.

The firm was founded in 2006 by Joseph R. Perella, Peter A. Weinberg and Terry Meguid, and went public in 2021. It is headquartered in New York City with offices in London, Paris, Munich, Houston, San Francisco, Los Angeles, Chicago, Denver and Calgary.

History
Perella Weinberg Partners was launched in June 2006, with offices in New York and London.

To help establish the firm's operations and to seed investment initiatives, Perella Weinberg raised over US$1.1 billion from a group of investors.

In 2016, the firm acquired the Houston-based energy investment and merchant banking firm Tudor, Pickering, Holt & Co., to be operated as the energy practice of Perella Weinberg.

In December 2020, the firm announced it would go public by merging with FinTech Acquisition Corporation IV, a Nasdaq-listed SPAC sponsored by Cohen & Company. The transaction closed in June 2021 and Perella Weinberg began trading on Nasdaq on June 25, 2021 under the ticker PWP.

Leadership
Prior to co-founding Perella Weinberg, Peter Weinberg was the CEO of Goldman Sachs International in London and co-headed the Global Investment Banking Division. Co-Presidents Andrew Bednar and Dietrich Becker have been Partners at Perella Weinberg since its founding in 2006.

Business

Advisory
Perella Weinberg advises clients on mergers and acquisitions, financial restructuring, capital structure and capital raising, liability management, shareholder engagement, and on other strategic and financial transactions. The firm advises corporate clients, family offices, governments, and special committees of Boards of Directors. The firm’s transactions range across industries including consumer and retail, energy, financial institutions, healthcare, industrials, technology, and telecom and media.

In 2012, the firm represented NYSE Euronext in its $11 billion sale to Intercontinental Exchange.

In June 2014, Perella advised on medical device maker Medtronic’s $42.9 billion acquisition of Covidien.

In October 2015, the firm advised Altria Group, Inc. in connection with AB InBev’s acquisition of SABMiller, valued at over $100 billion, approved in 2016.

In October 2016, Perella advised AT&T in its $108.7 billion acquisition of Time Warner. In December of the same year, they advised Linde in the all-share merger between Linde and Praxair, a deal valued at more than $65 billion.

In April 2017, the firm was retained by medical technology and drug company CareFusion to advise on their sale to Becton Dickinson, a deal valued at $12.2 billion in cash and stock.

In March 2018, the firm advised E.ON, a European electric utility company, in an asset swap with RWE. E.ON acquired RWE’s 76.8% stake in energy company Innogy, with RWE receiving a 16.67% share in E.ON along with its renewable businesses. In August 2018, the firm’s subsidiary Tudor, Pickering, Holt & Co. advised Energen Corp on their sale to Diamondback Energy Inc., an all-stock deal valued at approximately $9.2 billion.

In March 2019, the firm advised Oaktree Capital Management in its sale of a 62% stake to Brookfield Asset Management, a deal valued at approximately $4.7 billion. In June of the same year, Perella advised Altran in its sale to consulting firm Capgemini, a take-over valued at $4.1 billion. Later in October, Perella advised the board of Groupe PSA in their $50 billion merger with Fiat Chrysler Automobiles that, upon close, would create the world’s fourth-largest automaker. In November, Perella was the financial advisor to PayPal in their $4 billion acquisition of Honey Science Corp, a shopping and rewards platform.

Perella was financial advisor to the Directors of iHeart Media during its $20 billion restructuring, considered the largest restructuring of 2019. They were also advisor to the $4 billion recapitalization of Concordia Resources.

In April 2020, Perella was the financial advisor to an ad hoc group of PG&E unsecured bond holders in connection to PG&E’s restructuring agreement. In 2020, the firm served as financial advisor to California Resources Corporation in connection with various liability management transactions and the company’s pre-arranged Chapter 11 plan of reorganization.

In April 2020, the firm was hired to advise the U.S. Treasury Department in connection with the portion of the CARES Act focused on businesses critical to maintaining national security. In December 2020, Perella advised Northrop Grumman on the sale of its Federal IT and Mission Support Services Business to Veritas Capital for $3.4 billion.

In February 2021, Perella was the exclusive financial advisor to Kraft Heinz in connection with the sale of its Planters brand to Hormel Foods for $3.35 billion. In May, the firm was financial advisor to Discovery, Inc.’s Independent Transaction Committee in connection with Discovery’s combination with AT&T’s WarnerMedia, advised Cimarex Energy on its $8.9 billion all-stock merger of equals with Cabot Oil & Gas, and was financial advisor to Vonovia in connection with its $22 billion business combination with Deutsche Wohnen. Perella also advised KKR on its $5.3 billion take-private acquisition of Cloudera in June 2021. The firm advised MKS instruments on its $5.1 billion acquisition of Atotech in July of the same year.

Perella Weinberg has advised on numerous SPAC transactions such as Pershing Square Tontine Holding’s acquisition of 10% of Universal Music Group for approximately $4 billion  and Owl Rock Capital Group’s definitive business combination agreement with Dyal Capital Partners to form Blue Owl Capital Inc. and list on NYSE via a $12.5B business combination with Altimar Acquisition Corporation. The firm also advised Parallel, a medical marijuana company, on its $1.9 billion business combination with Ceres Acquisition Corporation in February, 2021, and served as financial advisor to Science 37 on its $1.05 billion merger with LifeSci Acquisition II Corporation in May of the same year.

In March 2021, Perella Weinberg and its partners sponsored PWP Forward Acquisition Corp. I, a blank check company led by women and focused on enhancing access to public financing for companies that are founded by, led by or enrich the lives of women.

Asset management
Perella Weinberg operates an asset management business separate from its investment banking business under the brand Agility, which is an outsourced CIO provider for endowments, foundations, sovereign wealth funds, family offices, and other long term investors. Chris Bittman serves as CEO and CIO of Agility, which managed assets of approximately $13.5 billion. Perella Weinberg Partners' Agility Fund was named Outsourced CIO of the Year by Institutional Investor in 2017, 2015 and 2014 and by Foundation & Endowment Intelligence in 2013.

References

External links
 Official website

American companies established in 2006
Banks established in 2006
Banks based in New York City
Companies listed on the Nasdaq
Financial services companies established in 2006
Investment banks in the United States
2006 establishments in New York City